Kim Jeong-hwan (born December 12, 1978), better known by his stage name Kim Poong is a South Korean webtoon artist.

Career 
He was a cast member in the variety show Please Take Care of My Refrigerator. 

He also appeared in The Genius: Rules of the Game in 2013.

References

External links

South Korean manhwa artists
South Korean webtoon creators
South Korean television chefs
Hongik University alumni
1978 births
Living people
South Korean chefs